Potassium channel subfamily K member 3 is a protein that in humans is encoded by the KCNK3 gene.

This gene encodes K2P3.1, one of the members of the superfamily of potassium channel proteins containing two pore-forming P domains. K2P3.1 is an outwardly rectifying channel that is sensitive to changes in extracellular pH and is inhibited by extracellular acidification. Also referred to as an acid-sensitive potassium channel, it is activated by the anesthetics halothane and isoflurane. Although three transcripts are detected in northern blots, there is currently no sequence available to confirm transcript variants for this gene.

Interactive pathway map

Interactions
KCNK3 has been shown to interact with YWHAB and S100A10.

See also
 Tandem pore domain potassium channel

References

Further reading

External links 
 

Ion channels